Princess Boryeong (died 1113) was a Goryeo Royal Princess as the younger daughter of King Munjong and Queen Inye who survived infancy along with her elder sister, Princess Jeokgyeong. She was also the youngest living sister to Sunjong, Seonjong, and Sukjong.

She was one of Yi Ja-yeon (이자연)'s maternal granddaughter and her father's 3rd and 4th wife were initially her maternal aunt. The princess later married her first cousin (her uncle's son), Wang Yeong (왕영) who became the Count Nakrang (낙랑백, 樂浪伯) upon their marriage. Together, they had 2 sons: Wang Jeong (왕정, 王禎) who would marry King Sukjong's 2nd daughter, Princess Heungsu, and Wang Ji (왕지, 王禔) who held an official position during King Yejong's reign.

Meanwhile, Princess Boryeong was later died a year after her husband in 1113 (8th year reign of her nephew, King Yejong) and buried in Olleung tomb (온릉, 溫陵), also received name Gyeongsun (경순, 慶順) as her Posthumous name.

References

External links 
Princess Boryeong on Goryeosa .

Goryeo princesses
1113 deaths
11th-century births
12th-century Korean women